The San Felipe (also known as El Lerri, El Terri, or Tyrri) is a historic shipwreck near Islamorada, Florida, United States. It is located east of Lower Matecumbe Key and south of the wreck of the San Pedro. On August 11, 1994, it was added to the U.S. National Register of Historic Places.

References

External links
 Monroe County listings at National Register of Historic Places
 Florida's Office of Cultural and Historical Programs
 Monroe County listings
 El Terri (San Felipe)

National Register of Historic Places in Monroe County, Florida
Shipwrecks of the Florida Keys
Shipwrecks on the National Register of Historic Places in Florida
Maritime incidents in 1733
Shipwrecks on the National Register of Historic Places